Disney Wish is the fifth and newest cruise ship owned and operated by Disney Cruise Line, a subsidiary of The Walt Disney Company. She is the largest ship in the fleet and the first of the Triton-class. She entered service in June 2022 and will be followed by her sister ships the Disney Treasure in 2024 and a second sister in 2025. The other four ships in the fleet are the Disney Magic, Disney Wonder, Disney Dream, and Disney Fantasy.

History
In March 2016, Disney Cruise Line announced that it had commissioned two new ships, described as larger than Disney Dream and Disney Fantasy but with an equivalent number of staterooms. A third ship of the class was announced on July 15, 2017 at the D23 Expo. In March 2018, Disney Cruise Line released the first rendering of its new generation of cruise ships. The 140,000-ton cruise liners would be LNG-powered and would accommodate at least 2,500 guests. In January 2019, the class of ship was confirmed as Triton in public documents published by Port Canaveral.

On August 25, 2019, the fifth ship was officially announced as the Disney Wish at the D23 Expo. Construction began in March 2020 at Meyer Werft, Germany, with the delivery date later changed due to the COVID-19 pandemic. Also announced at the D23 Expo was that Rapunzel would feature as the stern character on Disney Wish, with The Walt Disney Company releasing the design mock-ups for the ship, including a render of Cinderella as the ship's atrium character.

On April 8, 2021, during the keel laying ceremony, it was announced that Captain Minnie would be the centrepiece of the Disney Wish. On April 29, 2021, Disney Cruise Line shared a first look at their newest ship, Disney Wish, set to embark in mid-2022. Disney Wish has 1,250 staterooms, along with several restaurants, immersive spaces and experiences themed to Walt Disney Pictures, Marvel Cinematic Universe, Star Wars, and Pixar characters, plus the AquaMouse, the world's first Disney attraction at sea.

On February 3, 2022, it was announced that Disney Wish inaugural sailings were pushed back from June 9 to July 14, 2022, due to shipyard delays. On February 11, 2022, Disney Wish completed her float out in Papenburg, Germany, where the stern figure Rapunzel was revealed for the first time. In May 2022, it was announced that the ship would dock at Port Canaveral on June 20, followed by a livestreamed christening ceremony and a cruise for news media and travel experts on June 29.
 On June 9, 2022, Disney Wish was officially handed over to Disney Cruise Line, with the shipyard stating that the ship sailed to Portugal and Castaway Cay before her transatlantic voyage to Port Canaveral. She arrived at Port Canaveral on June 20, 2022, where she was welcomed by Mickey and Minnie Mouse. On June 21, 2022, the ship's first test cruise was cancelled, due to the ship not being ready. The following day, the second test cruise scheduled for June 24, 2022 was also cancelled to focus on the christening ceremony. On June 24, 2022, all past, present, and future Make-A-Wish children were announced to be the godchildren of the ship. On June 29, 2022, Disney Wish was officially christened by three ambassadors of the Make-A-Wish children before embarking on her 3-night christening cruise for the media to Castaway Cay.

On July 14, 2022, Disney Wish officially entered service and embarked on her maiden voyage, a five-night Bahamian cruise stopping at Nassau and Castaway Cay.

On December 24, 2022, National Geographic released a documentary Making the Disney Wish: Disney's Newest Cruise Ship showing the making of the Disney Wish and her design process. It was directed, written, and produced by Chad Cohen, with Bethany Jones also writing and producing, alongside Disney Yellow Shoes. Filming occurred from June 2021 shortly after construction began until its maiden voyage in July 2022. The film debuted on Disney+ on February 17, 2023.

Design
[[File:Disney Wish smokestack detail.jpg|thumb|right|The Wish'''s rear smokestack. ]]Disney Wish has a gross tonnage of 144,000 GT, a length of 1,119 ft, and a width of 128 ft. Disney Wish has a capacity of 1,555 crew and 4,000 passengers with 1,254 staterooms.Disney Wish was announced to play songs from Disney movies and parks using its horns, specifically: "A Dream Is a Wish Your Heart Makes" from Cinderella, "Be Our Guest" from Beauty and the Beast, "Yo Ho (A Pirate's Life for Me)" from Pirates of the Caribbean, the Pinocchio songs "When You Wish Upon a Star" and "Hi-Diddle-Dee-Dee (An Actor's Life for Me)", "We Don't Talk About Bruno" from Encanto, "Do You Want to Build a Snowman?" from Frozen, "It's a Small World (After All)", and the "Star Wars (Main Title)". Currently, the Disney Wish is revealed to have 18 horns though she is speculated to have more than the Dream class.

The Disney Wish also incorporates a New Orleans-themed design, which can be seen in its ceiling full of flowers in The Bayou section.

Recreation
 Three rotational dining experiences: 1923, Worlds of Marvel, and Arendelle: A Frozen Dining Adventure
 The 1923 restaurant embodies old Hollywood styles, with the aim to make guests feel classy and think about the history of Walt Disney himself.
 The Worlds of Marvel includes the immersive family dining experience "Avengers: Quantum Encounter". The experience takes place during dinner with interactive elements and a full CGI recreation of the Wishs upper decks. Paul Rudd, Evangeline Lilly, Anthony Mackie, Brie Larson, Kerry Condon, Ross Marquand, and Iman Vellani reprised their Marvel Cinematic Universe (MCU) roles. Imagineer Danny Handke directed "Avengers: Quantum Encounter", with a script by himself, Steven Spiegel, and Michael Waldron, and music composed by Michael Tavera. Sequence directors include Nia DaCosta, Chris Waitt, and Bradford Burah.
 Arendelle: A Frozen Dining Adventure takes place in the palace, where guests are attending an engagement party for Anna and Kristoff, joined by other Frozen characters.
 Star Wars: Hyperspace Lounge and Cargo Bay
 Inside Out: Joyful Sweets
 Olaf's Royal Picnic
 The Incredibles: Hero Zone
 AquaMouse: the world's first Disney attraction at sea based on The Wonderful World of Mickey Mouse with music by Christopher Willis. It features two new storylines that alternate on different days of the cruise: "Swiss Meltdown" and "Scuba Scramble."
 Disney Uncharted Adventure AR Experience
 Broadway-style shows at the Walt Disney Theatre: The Little Mermaid, Disney Seas the Adventure, and Disney's Aladdin: A Musical Spectacular''

References

External links 

 
 Disney Cruise Line

2022 ships
Art Nouveau ships
Hyperspace Lounge
Cruise ships
Ships built in Papenburg
Ships of Disney Cruise Line
Outer space in amusement parks